Oleksiy Tyshchenko (born 21 July 1994) is a professional Ukrainian football midfielder who plays for Myr Hornostayivka.

Club career
Tyshchenko is the product of Mykolaiv youth sportive school and FC Torpedo Mykolaiv. His first trainer was Hennadiy Levytskyi. He signed a contract with SC Tavriya in February 2014. He made his debut for SC Tavriya Simferopol as a substituted player in the game against FC Illichivets Mariupol on 16 May 2014 in the Ukrainian Premier League. In July 2014, Tyshchenko moved to the Latvian Higher League, signing a contract with FC Jūrmala. Under the management of former Manchester United player Andrei Kanchelskis, he played 11 league matches, scoring one goal. Tyshchenko scored in a 2–1 defeat against FC Jūrmala rivals FK Spartaks Jūrmala on 18 October 2014.

References

External links

1994 births
Living people
Ukrainian footballers
Association football midfielders
Ukrainian Premier League players
Ukrainian Second League players
FC Dynamo Khmelnytskyi players
SC Tavriya Simferopol players
FC Jūrmala players
Ukrainian expatriate footballers
Expatriate footballers in Latvia
FC Myr Hornostayivka players
Sportspeople from Mykolaiv